The women's individual épée competition at the 2006 Asian Games in Doha was held on 10 December at the Al-Arabi Indoor Hall.

Schedule
All times are Arabia Standard Time (UTC+03:00)

Results

Round of pools

Pool 1

Pool 2

Pool 3

Pool 4

Summary

Knockout round

Final

Top half

Bottom half

Final standing

References
Pools

External links
Official website

Women Epee